Aralazhdarcho is a genus of azhdarchid pterosaur from the Santonian to the early Campanian stages of the Late Cretaceous period of Bostobe Svita in Kazakhstan. The type and only known species is Aralazhdarcho bostobensis.

Etymology
Aralazhdarcho was named in 2007 by Alexander Averianov. In 2004, the holotype had already been described. The genus name, Aralazhdarcho, is derived from the Aral Sea and the related genus Azhdarcho, while the specific name, bostobensis, refers to the Bostobe Formation.

Description
Aralazhdarcho is based on holotype ZIN PH, no. 9/43, consisting of the anterior end of a neck vertebra, probably the fifth or sixth. Several paratypes have also been referred: a jugal, a toothless lower jaw fragment, centra from vertebrae, the distal end of a scapula, the proximal end of a second phalanx of the left wing finger and the proximal end of a left femur, of which, however, the head has broken off. The remains were found at the Shakh-Shakh locality.

Classification
Averianov, the describer, assigned Aralazhdarcho to the family Azhdarchidae, in view of its lack of teeth and geological age. Averianov presumed it presented a more southern form as opposed to the contemporary related genus Bogolubovia that was found in adjoining more northern regions. The cladogram below shows a phylogenetic analysis recovered by Nicholas Longrich and colleagues in 2018. They found Aralazhdarcho as the sister taxon of Phosphatodraco, both within the Azhdarchidae.

See also
 Timeline of pterosaur research
 List of pterosaurs

References

Late Cretaceous pterosaurs of Asia
Azhdarchids
Fossil taxa described in 2007